The National Foundation for Infectious Diseases (abbreviated NFID) is a 501(c)(3) non-profit organization dedicated to educating the public and medical community about infectious diseases. It was established in 1973 and is based in Bethesda, Maryland.


History
The National Foundation for Infectious Diseases originated at the Medical College of Virginia's Infectious Disease Division. In early 1973, several individuals there had the idea of creating a non-governmental organization to raise awareness of, and help develop treatments for, infectious diseases. Later that year, the NFID was created, originally as a non-profit corporation based in Virginia. The original founders of the NFID included John P. Utz and Richard J. Duma, who served as the organization's first and second president, respectively.

References

External links
 

Organizations established in 1973
501(c)(3) organizations
1973 establishments in Virginia
Infectious disease organizations
Medical and health foundations in the United States

Non-profit organizations based in Maryland